The Patriotic Front (PF) is a social democratic political party in Zambia. The party was formed by Michael Sata as a breakaway party of the Movement for Multiparty Democracy (MMD) in 2001 after the President Frederick Chiluba nominated Levy Mwanawasa as its presidential candidate for 2001 elections. The party's main base of support are usually the youth and poor people in urban centres (although this support wavered starting in 2021), as well as members of the Bemba people in Copperbelt Province and Lusaka Province.

After several years, the PF gained power in the 2011 general elections, and governed until the 2021 elections.

Formation
The Patriotic Front was formed as a political party in 2001. In 2000, after Chiluba lost a bid to change the constitution to allow him to stand for third term, Michael Sata thought he would be endorsed as the MMD presidential candidate. The answer was given in 2001 when Chiluba noted that none of those (including Sata) who were in his government at the time were capable of winning the elections. At a secret ballot, Chiluba personally nominated Mwanawasa and voted for him to be the presidential candidate. Angered by this turn of events, Sata quit the MMD and founded the PF. At the same time, notable figures like Christon Tembo, Godfrey Miyanda and Edith Nawakwi formed the Forum for Democracy and Development (FDD). Party. Sata became leader of the PF and was its presidential candidate for the 2001 general elections; he received 3.4% of the vote, finishing seventh out of the eleven candidates. In the National Assembly elections the party received 2.8% of the vote, winning a single seat.

Sata was again the party's presidential candidate in the 2006 general elections, this time finishing second to Levy Patrick  Mwanawasa with 29% of the vote. With its National Assembly vote share increasing to 23% , the party won 43 seats, becoming the largest opposition party. Following Mwanawasa's death, a presidential by-election was held in 2008. Sata finished second to MMD candidate Rupiah Banda with 38% of the vote to Banda's 40%.

The 2011 general elections saw a reversal of the 2008 result, with Sata beating Banda by a margin of 42% to 35%. The PF also became the largest party in the National Assembly, winning 60 of the 150 seats. However, Sata died in office in October 2014. Vice-President Guy Scott took over as interim president until a by-election was held in January 2015. Edgar Lungu was selected as the party's candidate, and won the election with 48% of the vote.

In 2016 Edgar Lungu won again as the president with 50.35%, beating Hakainde Hichilema, now the President of Zambia by 100,530 votes or 2.72%.

In the lead up to the 2021 general election, Amnesty International publicly raised concerns about the violation of civil liberties, crackdowns on dissent and police killings while the party held political power.

Electoral history

Presidential elections

National Assembly elections

References

External links
Facebook page of the Patriotic Front (PF)

2001 establishments in Zambia
Conservative parties in Africa
Consultative member parties of the Socialist International
Political parties established in 2001
Political parties in Zambia
Social conservative parties
Social democratic parties in Zambia